L'Hermite may refer to the following persons:

 Jacques l'Hermite, a Dutch merchant, explorer and admiral of the 17th century
 Jean-Marthe-Adrien l'Hermite, a French sea captain of the late 18th century
 François Tristan l'Hermite, a French dramatist who wrote under the name Tristan l'Hermite
 Tristan l'Hermite, a French political and military figure of the late Middle Ages

See also
 Hermite (disambiguation)
 Lhermitte (disambiguation)